Victor Dibovsky (Russian: Ви́ктор Влади́мирович Дыбо́вский tr. Viktor Vladimirovič Dybóvskij; January 25, 1884 – December 29, 1953), was a Russian aviation pioneer.

Early life
Victor Dibovsky was born in Smolensk into a gentry family. He started naval service in 1901, seeing action in the Russo-Japanese War, including the Battle of Tsushima. He served in Baltic Fleet and Black Sea Fleet of the Imperial Russian navy. He started studying aeronautics in 1909.

Aviation career
Dibovsky was the first pilot to detect a submerged submarine in 1911., and first Russian to use radio on an aircraft. In 1912 he covered the distance between Sevastopol and St Petersburg in 25 flight hours, a record at the time. In 1913 he designed an airplane, “Dolphin”, remarkable for outstanding aerodynamic qualities.

World War I
During World War I, Victor Dibovsky fought in the 20 Corps aviation group, earning orders of St George (Russia's highest award for valour), St Stanislaus, St Vladimir and a number of medals. He was the inventor of the Scarff-Dibovski synchronization gear, used by the UK Royal Naval Air Service

In 1916 he was promoted to commander and came to London as the head of Russian naval air mission.

Emigration and death
The revolution prevented Victor Dibovsky from coming back to Russia. He lived in UK, France, USA and later in Britain again. He patented some new inventions  and his research received media coverage. In 1953 he died of tuberculosis in London and was buried in a paupers’ grave at St Pancras and Islington Cemetery. In 2019, the place of his burial was marked with a memorial.

Honours and awards
Order of Saint Vladimir, 4th class
Order of Saint Stanislaus (House of Romanov), 3rd and 2nd class
Order of St. George, 4th class
Order of St Michael and St George

References

External links
Photo from Imperial War Museum, with comments on Dibovsky's biography

Entry on Russian military biographical dictionary

1884 births
1953 deaths
Aviation history of Russia
Aviation inventors
Emigrants from the Russian Empire to the United Kingdom
Russian inventors
Companions of the Order of St Michael and St George